The Pindad MO-3 81 mm medium weight mortar is an Indonesian-designed smooth bore, muzzle-loading, high-angle-of-fire weapon used for long-range indirect fire support to light infantry, air assault, and airborne units across the entire front of a battalion zone of influence. In the Indonesian Army and Indonesian Marine Corps, it is normally deployed in the mortar platoon of an infantry battalion.

See also
 Artillery
 Military technology and equipment
 List of artillery
 Pindad

References

81mm mortars
Infantry mortars
Military equipment introduced in the 2000s